The Minority Leader, or the Leader of the Opposition, leads the largest political party not in government in the National Assembly of Cambodia. The Minority Leader acts as a dialogue partner of the Prime Minister, and the Majority Leader. The official minority party must secure at least 25% of the total seats in Parliament.

The role was officially recognized by Parliament in November 2014, making Sam Rainsy the first official Minority Leader. However, prior to this, Rainsy had often been viewed as the de facto Leader of the Opposition.

As in nearly every parliamentary democracy around the world, the Minority Leader comes from the political party with the largest number of seats in the Parliament yet is not in government. The Minority Leader is often seen as a Prime Minister-in-waiting.

The position was abolished by Parliament on 31 January 2017.

List of Opposition Leaders

See also
 List of prime ministers of Cambodia
 List of political parties in Cambodia
 Parliament of Cambodia

References

Government of Cambodia
Leaders of the Opposition (Cambodia)
Cambodia politics-related lists
Cambodia